The Monte Generoso Railway or Ferrovia Monte Generoso (MG) is a mountain railway line  in the Italian speaking canton of Ticino, in south-east Switzerland. The line runs from Capolago, on Lake Lugano, to a terminus near the summit of Monte Generoso. It is the highest railway in Ticino. The summit offers extensive views over the Lombardy Plain, part of the Po Valley, and towards the Alps.

Whilst the railway lies entirely within Switzerland, the summit station is only a few metres from the international border with the Italian region of Lombardy. The line is owned by the Migros group, better known for operating supermarkets throughout Switzerland.

History 

In 1867, Doctor Carlo Pasta built a hotel on Monte Generoso, near to the current location of the Bellavista station on the Monte Generoso railway. In 1886, a concession was granted to the Monte Generoso SA for the construction of a narrow gauge and cog railway to the summit. The line opened on the June 5, 1890, and was originally operated with steam locomotives. The following year, the Tramway Bellavista was opened to link the railway to Doctor Pasta's hotel.

However the owning company encountered financial difficulties at various times during the first half of the 20th century. In the 1939, the then owners approached Gottlieb Duttweiler, the founder of the Migros group, for assistance, and in 1941 the railway became part of that group.

In 1954, two diesel locomotives (Hm 2/3 1 and 2) were built on the frames of older steam locomotives, followed, in 1957, by two four-axle diesel railcars (Bhm 2/4 3 and 4), which allowed a more economical operation. In 1968, two smaller two-axle railcars (Bhm 1/2 5 and 6) were introduced. In 1982 the line was electrified and four twin-unit railcars (Bhe 4/8 11 to 14) were supplied by SLM in 1981-2.

At the end of the season in 2013, the line closed for the winter as normal. It was then announced that it would not reopen to passengers until 2015, in order to facilitate the rebuilding of the hotel and restaurant at the summit. The closure was extended twice, and eventually the new building, designed by Mario Botta, opened on 8 April 2017. In the meantime, the railway was used for the transport of construction materials and workers.

Route 
The line commences at Capolago Lago station, where trains connect with boat services of the Società Navigazione del Lago di Lugano on Lake Lugano. The line's car shed and workshop are both situated on the line between the two Capolago stops.

At Capolago-Riva San Vitale station, the line serves a stop on the street in front of the station building, before climbing a ramp to cross a bridge over the throat of the mainline station. Both San Nicolao and Bellavista stations have passing loops, but the latter is the normal passing place for ascending and descending trains.

The station is located a short walk from the mountain summit, and has a buffet, restaurant and rooftop viewing gallery.

Operation 
It is a rack railway, with a maximum gradient of 22%, using the Abt design. The line is electrified using an 850 V DC overhead line, and is principally operated by the four two-car electric trains built in 1981-2.

The line operates from mid-March to early November, with trains running hourly during daylight hours. If traffic requires it, the hourly departure may be operated as multiple trains running in convoy. A late evening train operates on Fridays and Saturdays only. Only one train a day runs through to Capolago Lago, in order to connect with a boat service from Lugano.

One steam locomotive still exists, as does one of the original coaches, and two diesel locomotives. The remaining steam and diesel locomotives operate occasional services. One of the Bhm 1/2 diesel railcars is preserved in the Museo Europeo dei Trasporti Ogliari in Ranco on the Italian shore of Lake Maggiore.

See also
List of mountain railways in Switzerland
List of narrow-gauge railways in Switzerland

References

Bibliography

External links 

Ferrovia Monte Generoso website

Mountain railways
800 mm gauge railways in Switzerland
MG
Railway lines in Switzerland
Transport in Ticino
Rack railways in Switzerland
Migros